Federated may refer to:

 Federated state, a constituent state within a federal state
 Federated school, a model of administration in some educational institutions
 Federated congregation, a type of religious congregation

Computing 
 Federated identity, a type of electronic identity
 Federated learning, a machine learning technique
Federated protocol, in networking, the ability for users to send messages from one network to another
 Federated architecture, a pattern in enterprise architecture
 Federated search, a type of electronic search
 Federated database system, a type of meta-database management system
 Federated content, a type of digital media content

Other 
 Federated Tower, a skyscraper in Pittsburgh, Pennsylvania
 Federated Department Stores, now known as the Macy's, Inc.
 Federated Group, a 1980s era chain of home electronics retailers
 Federated Investors, a financial services company in Pittsburgh, Pennsylvania

See also 
 Federal (disambiguation)
 Federation (disambiguation)